North Muroc is a former settlement in Kern County, California. North Muroc still appeared on maps as of 1947.

References

Former settlements in Kern County, California
Former populated places in California